is a Japanese politician of the Liberal Democratic Party, a former member of the House of Representatives in the Diet (national legislature). A native of Nagoya, Aichi and graduate of Tokyo Keizai University, he was elected to the House of Representatives for the first time in 1996 after having served in the Aichi Prefectural Assembly for three terms since 1983.

References

External links 
 Official website in Japanese.

1955 births
Living people
People from Nagoya
Members of the House of Representatives (Japan)
Members of the Aichi Prefectural Assembly
Liberal Democratic Party (Japan) politicians
21st-century Japanese politicians